The Edwin E. Benedict House was a historic house located on Cox Island in the Siuslaw River, near Florence, Oregon, United States.

The house was listed on the National Register of Historic Places in 1979.

See also
 National Register of Historic Places listings in Lane County, Oregon

References

External links

1902 establishments in Oregon
Gothic Revival architecture in Oregon
Houses completed in 1902
Houses in Lane County, Oregon
Houses on the National Register of Historic Places in Oregon
National Register of Historic Places in Lane County, Oregon